The canton of Plaisance-du-Touch is an administrative division of the Haute-Garonne department, southern France. It was created at the French canton reorganisation which came into effect in March 2015. Its seat is in Plaisance-du-Touch.

It consists of the following communes:
 
Bonrepos-sur-Aussonnelle
Bragayrac
Empeaux
Fonsorbes
Fontenilles
Plaisance-du-Touch
Sabonnères
Saiguède
Saint-Lys
Saint-Thomas

References

Cantons of Haute-Garonne